The Lyuli, Jughi (self-name - Mugat and Ghorbati) or Jugi are a branch of the Ghorbati people living in Central Asia, primarily Tajikistan, Uzbekistan, Turkmenistan, Kazakhstan, and southern Kyrgyzstan; also, related groups can be found in Turkey, Crimea, Southern Russia and Afghanistan. They speak ethnolects of the Persian and Turkic language and practice Sunni Islam. The terms “Lyuli” and “Jugi” are pejorative. They have a clan organization (the Lyuli word for ‘clan’ is tupar, the Jughi word  - avlod). Division into sub-clans is also practiced. The Lyuli community is extremely closed towards non-Lyuli.

Etymology 
There are several names for the Lyuli: Jughi, Multani, Bombay or Luli. However, they refer to themselves as Muğat (Мугат) or Mughat, as well as Gurbeti, which means "lonely". The term Multani signifies a person who originates from the city of Multan (in modern-day Pakistan), because some of the Lyuli emigrated from Multan after the Siege of Multan, 1296–1297 to Central Asia.

History 
Similar to Romani residing elsewhere, the Lyuli originate from India. According to local traditions held by the Lyuli, their community already existed in the region by the time of Timur. In time, the Lyuli began adopting the customs, languages, and the Islamic faith of their Central Asian neighbors. Many Lyuli were nomadic until the early 20th century, when they began living in urban areas.

Lyuli in Kyrgyzstan
The Lyuli live in the south of Kyrgyzstan, in Osh Region. Their living standard is extremely low. Many Lyuli have no official documents. Education is conducted in Russian, Kyrgyz, or Uzbek, but many Muğat lack education. Lyuli society is working towards improvement of their living standards, education and knowledge of Kyrgyz and Russian, and preservation of their culture.

Lyuli in Uzbekistan
There are approximately 12,000 Lyuli in Uzbekistan. While children converse in their native language or mixed speech at home, poor educational standards and poverty have gradually reduced fluency rates in favour of Russian or Uzbek.

Lyuli in Russia
Starting from the early 1990s, the Lyuli began migrating into Southern Russian cities, most noticeably around railway stations and markets. At first, Russians mistakenly identified them as Tajik refugees or ethnic Uzbeks due to their traditional Central Asian robes. Russian Roma emphasize that the Lyuli are distinct from them and not Roma, and are considered  to be of Indo-Turkic people origin. They are a frequent target of Russian far right skinheads.

Jugi in Iran

Jugi people are a Nomad group, who believe once came from Egypt, living in Mazandaran Province of Iran and in Central Asia, called as Central Asian Gypsy and confused with European Romani people.

Balkans
The Ottoman Archives of the 18th and 19th century, told from 4 clans of the so-called Türkmen Kıpti who spoke a Turkik dialect with few Romani words in their jargon and who were Alevi of Bektashi Order, as a separate group of other Roma people in Rumelia. They migrated from Central Asia to Anatolia. At Dulkadiroğlu, Kahramanmaraş, they was registered in the 16th as Gurbet at the time of the Ottoman Empire, and settled finally in the Balkans and Crimean Khanate. Turkish Roma from Varna in Bulgaria who called themself as Usta Millet or Mehter, claimed to be descendants of this special tribe.

Culture 
In the past the Lyuli used to work as wandering musical entertainers, fortune-tellers, peddlers and beggars. Women also worked as tailors for other non-Lyuli women, including making hairnets for veils. Some subgroups specialized in other trades like woodworking. Modern Lyuli are now settled and work in diverse occupations including in education, factories, business and more.

The Lyuli are devout Sunni Muslims. Their religious practices are as orthodox as that of their coreligionists but some traces of pre-Islamic beliefs have continued to endure.

The Lyuli face discrimination from others and social marginalization. Some suffer from poverty and isolation.

See also
 History of the Romani people
 Romani people by country
 Gudar people

References

External links

  Marushiakova, Elena and Vesselin Popov. 2016. Gypsies of Central Asia and Caucasus. London: Palgrave Macmillan.
 Perceptions of Identity: Luli in Uzbekistan, a visit to a Luli community and brief summaries of interviews

Ethnic groups in Tajikistan
Ethnic groups in Uzbekistan
Ethnic groups in Kyrgyzstan